Kabo is a Local Government Area in Kano State, Nigeria. Its headquarters are in the town of Kabo.

It has an area of 341 km and a population of 153,828 at the 2006 census.

The postal code of the area is 704.

References

Local Government Areas in Kano State